Ronald Arthur Silver (July 2, 1946 – March 15, 2009) was an American actor/activist, director, producer, and radio host. As an actor, he portrayed Henry Kissinger, Alan Dershowitz and Angelo Dundee. He was awarded a Tony in 1988 for Best Actor for Speed-the-Plow, a satirical dissection of the American movie business.

Early life
Silver was born on July 2, 1946, in Manhattan, the son of May (née Zimelman), a substitute teacher, and Irving Roy Silver, a clothing sales executive. Silver was raised Jewish on the Lower East Side of Manhattan and attended Stuyvesant High School.

Silver went on to graduate from the State University of New York at Buffalo, with a Bachelor of Arts in Spanish and Chinese, and received a master's degree in Chinese History from St. John's University in New York and the Chinese Culture University in Taiwan. He also attended Columbia University's Graduate School of International Affairs (SIPA) and studied acting at the Herbert Berghof Studio, and later at The Actors Studio. As a student he was exempt from the Vietnam War draft.

Career
Silver got his big acting break starring in El Grande de Coca-Cola in 1974. Producers Richard Flanzer and Roy Silver (no relation) opened it at the famed Whisky a Go Go on the Sunset Strip in Los Angeles. The production ran for more than a year. Silver and his co-star, actor Jeff Goldblum, were discovered by Hollywood film agents during this show's run.

In 1976, he made his film debut in Tunnel Vision, and also played a placekicker in the football comedy film Semi-Tough. From 1976 to 1978, he had a recurring role as Gary Levy in the sitcom Rhoda, a spinoff from The Mary Tyler Moore Show. Additional screen roles include a psychiatrist in the horror story The Entity (1983), the devoted son of Anne Bancroft in Garbo Talks (1984), an incompetent detective in Eat and Run (1986), the pistol-wielding psychopath stalking Jamie Lee Curtis in 1989's Blue Steel, and the lead in Paul Mazursky's Oscar-nominated Enemies: A Love Story (1989).

He starred as Jerry Lewis's character's son in the multi-episode "Garment District Arc" of the television crime series Wiseguy (1988).

He portrayed two well-known attorneys in films based on actual events, playing defense attorney Alan Dershowitz in the drama Reversal of Fortune (1990), based on the trial of Claus von Bülow and defense attorney Robert Shapiro in the television film American Tragedy (2000), the story of the O. J. Simpson trial.

From 1991 to 2000, Silver served as president of the Actors' Equity Association. He played a film producer in Best Friends opposite Burt Reynolds and Goldie Hawn (1982), an actor in Lovesick (1983) and a film director in Mr. Saturday Night (1992). Silver portrayed a corrupt, rogue senator in the 1994 Jean-Claude Van Damme sci-fi thriller Timecop.

On television in 1998, he starred opposite Kirstie Alley for season two of her TV comedy series Veronica's Closet.

In other films based on true stories, Silver portrayed tennis player Bobby Riggs in the TV docudrama When Billie Beat Bobby (2001), about Riggs' real-life exhibition tennis match against Billie Jean King, which Riggs lost. He was also featured as Muhammad Ali's boxing trainer and cornerman Angelo Dundee in Michael Mann's 2001 biopic Ali.

From 2001 to 2002 and again from 2005 to 2006, he had a recurring role as presidential campaign adviser Bruno Gianelli on the NBC series The West Wing.

Silver provided the narration for the 2004 political documentary film FahrenHYPE 9/11 that was produced as a conservative political response to the award-winning and controversial Michael Moore documentary film, Fahrenheit 9/11.

Silver also narrated a MEMRI documentary film about the Arab and Iranian reactions to the September 11 attacks called The Arab and Iranian Reaction to 911: Five Years Later.

Additionally, Silver narrated the audiobook versions of several Philip Roth novels, including American Pastoral, The Plot Against America, and Portnoy's Complaint.

One of his final film performances was as a judge in another true story, 2006's Find Me Guilty, directed by Sidney Lumet and starring Vin Diesel.

In February 2008, Silver began hosting The Ron Silver Show on Sirius Satellite Radio, which focused on politics and public affairs. The show aired live at 9–11am ET, on Indie Talk, Sirius 110.

Personal life
Silver traveled to more than 30 countries and spoke fluent Mandarin Chinese and Spanish. He taught at the high school level and was a social worker for the Department of Social Services.

In 1975 he married a social worker, later Self magazine editor, Lynne Miller; the marriage lasted until their divorce in 1997.

In 1989, he co-founded the Creative Coalition, an entertainment industry political advocacy organization that champions First Amendment rights, public education, and support for the arts.

Politics
Silver was a member of the Council on Foreign Relations. In 2000, he co-founded the organization One Jerusalem to oppose the Oslo Peace Agreement and to maintain "a united Jerusalem as the undivided capital of Israel".

Silver, who had been a lifelong Democrat, left the party and became an independent and a supporter of President George W. Bush after the September 11 attacks, citing those attacks and Democratic policies regarding terrorism as reasons. He spoke at the 2004 Republican National Convention, continued to support President Bush, and was appointed Chairman for the Millennium Committee by New York Mayor Rudy Giuliani.

In Silver's blog on the PJ Media website, he claimed that colleagues on the set of The West Wing referred to him as "Ron, Ron, the Neo-Con".

On October 7, 2005, Silver was nominated by President Bush to be a Member of the Board of Directors of the United States Institute of Peace. On September 8, 2006, it was announced that Silver had joined an advisory committee to the Lewis Libby Legal Defense Trust.

President George W. Bush appointed Silver to serve on the Honorary Delegation to accompany him to Jerusalem for the celebration of the 60th anniversary of the State of Israel in May 2008.

In one of his last televised interviews, he told Sky News that Senator John McCain's choice of Sarah Palin as his running mate in the 2008 Presidential election was a "brilliant political choice" but that a part of him wished to "see an African American become president in my lifetime". According to the obituary printed by The New York Times, his brother, Mitchell Silver, noted that "He told me that he did vote for Barack Obama in the end".

Death
Silver, a long-time smoker, died on March 15, 2009, at the age of 62, of esophageal cancer, which had been diagnosed two years earlier. He is buried at Westchester Hills Cemetery in Hastings-on-Hudson, New York.

Filmography

Film

Television

References

External links
 
 

1946 births
2009 deaths
American bloggers
American male film actors
American male television actors
American political activists
American political writers
American male non-fiction writers
Burials at Westchester Hills Cemetery
Deaths from cancer in New York (state)
School of International and Public Affairs, Columbia University alumni
Deaths from esophageal cancer
Drama Desk Award winners
East Side Hebrew Institute alumni
Jewish American male actors
Male actors from New York City
New York (state) Democrats
New York (state) Independents
Sirius Satellite Radio
St. John's University (New York City) alumni
Stuyvesant High School alumni
Tony Award winners
University at Buffalo alumni
20th-century American male actors
21st-century American male actors
21st-century American non-fiction writers
American male bloggers
People from the Lower East Side
20th-century American male writers
20th-century American Jews
21st-century American Jews
Presidents of the Actors' Equity Association